Qombo'ul is a very old and historical town in the eastern Sanaag region of Somaliland.

Overview
Qombo'ul lies approximately 40 km east of Badhan, on the road to Bosaso and west of the town of Mindigale.

An old settlement that is ancient, it is the site of quite a few ancient ruins, buildings and structures, many of obscure origins. Eastern Somaliland in general is home to numerous such archaeological sites, with similar edifices found at Haylan, Qa’ableh, Maydh, Gelweita and El Ayo. However, many of these old structures have yet to be properly explored, a process which would help shed further light on local history and facilitate their preservation for posterity.

See also
Administrative divisions of Somaliland
Regions of Somaliland
Districts of Somaliland
Somalia–Somaliland border

Haylan
Qa’ableh
Maydh
Gelweita
El Ayo

Notes

References
LaasqorayNET
MaakhirNET
Somali Public Radio
Hadaaftimo Online
Allsanaag

Populated places in Sanaag
Archaeological sites in Somaliland